Bendahara (Jawi: بنداهارا) is an administrative position within classical Malay kingdoms comparable to a vizier before the intervention of European powers during the 19th century. A bendahara was appointed by a sultan and was a hereditary post. The bendahara and the sultan shared the same lineage.

Tasks of the Bendahara

The closest post which is comparable to the post of the vizier as the Malay kingdoms are Islamic kingdoms. As the bendahara is the head of the nobility, the status confers certain responsibility. The bendahara is the backbone of the Malay Sultanate. For the ancient kingdoms of Malacca and Johor, there were many tasks and responsibilities but the primary ones were:

 coronation and installation of the Sultan
 responsibility of the welfare of the Sultan
 adviser to his majesty on affairs of the state based on Sharia and Adat (Prevailing norms and values)
 responsibility of the Royal marriage, birth and funeral
 responsibility of the royal succession if the Sultan dies without an heir
 acting as a vicegerent if the Sultan is still young
 acting on any command of the Sultan.

Legitimacy of the Sultan lies with the bendahara. The bendahara always consulted the other nobles before arriving at a decision. The bendahara and nobles do this for the well-being of the subjects and is essential if there are problems in the state. These tasks are more extensive than any vizier or the modern prime minister.

The involvement of the British and the Dutch in the administration of the Malay States and the subsequent independence of Malaysia and Indonesia has reduced the Bendahara to a symbolic title only.

History

Though it is unclear when the title was first used, the Sultanate of Malacca had several influential bendaharas. The most famous is Tun Perak. Under Tun Perak's service which spanned several sultans, Malacca reached its height in the late 15th century. According to the Malay Annals and the Hikayat Hang Tuah, the bendahara secretly saved the life of Hang Tuah, a laksamana the sultan had ordered killed.

In 1612, Bendahara Tun Sri Lanang of the Sultanate of Johor was commissioned by Sultan Alauddin Riaayat Shah of Johor to compile Malay history and record it into a book. The book was known as Sulalatus Salatin and later known as Sejarah Melayu, an important literary piece in Malay language history. In 1699, Bendahara Abdul Jalil became Sultan Abdul Jalil IV of Johor after the previous sultan, Mahmud Shah II was murdered, leaving no heir behind. After the rule of Sultan Abdul Jalil IV, the bendahara was awarded Pahang as his personal fief. Bendahara Tun Abbas and his descendants ruled Pahang continuously until Tun Mutahir, who was deposed in a civil war in 1863.

The current Terengganu sultanate was founded by Sultan Zainal Abidin I of Terengganu in 1708. He was the son of Tun Habib Abdul Majid, a 17th-century bendahara of Johor.

Bendaharas of Malacca and Johor

Tun Perpatih Muka Berjajar, Bendahara
Tun Perpatih Tulus, Bendahara of Malacca
Raden Bagus, Bendahara of Malacca
Raden Anum, Bendahara Sri Amar DiRaja, Bendahara of Malacca
Tun Perpatih Sedang, Bendahara Sri Wak Raja, Bendahara of Malacca
Tun Perpatih Putih, Bendahara Paduka Tuan, Bendahara of Malacca
Tun Perak, Bendahara Paduka Raja, Bendahara of Malacca
Tun Mutahir, Bendahara Seri Maharaja, Bendahara of Malacca
Tun Rosmawe, Bendahara Paduka Tuan, Bendahara of Malacca

After the fall of Malacca to the Portuguese, the Malacca Sultanate was succeeded by the Johore Sultanate.

Tun Khoja, Bendahara Paduka Raja, Bendahara of Johore
Tun Biajid, Bendahara Seri Maharaja, Bendahara of Johore
Tun Mahmud, Bendahara Tun Narawangsa, Bendahara of Johore
Tun Isap Misai, Bendahara Seri Maharaja, Bendahara of Johore
Tun Sri Lanang, Bendahara Paduka Raja, Bendahara of Johore. He was captured by the Achenese forces and opted to remain in Acheh.

The following Bendaharas were sidelined by the palace following the rise of Laksamana Paduka Tuan:

Tun Anum, Bendahara Seri Maharaja, Bendahara of Johore
Tun Mat Ali, Bendahara Paduka Tuan, Bendahara of Johore
Tun Rantau, Bendahara Seri Maharaja, Bendahara of Johore. He was captured by the Jambi forces.
Tun Habib Abdul Majid, Bendahara Seri Maharaja, Bendahara Padang Saujana, restored the position of the Bendahara in the palace.
Tun Abdul Jalil, Bendahara Paduka Raja, became Sultan Abdul Jalil IV of Johor, following the death of Sultan Mahmud II. The Bendahara branch of the dynasty still rules the Malaysian state of Johor today.
Tun Abbas, Bendahara Seri Maharaja, Bendahara of Johore and Pahang

After the succession of Sultan Abdul Jalil IV in Johor, the Bendahara were granted Pahang as a personal fief. Thereafter the Bendahara of Johor were known as the Bendahara in Pahang. They are also known as "Raja Bendahara" for their status as the rulers of Melaka as a vassal state of  the Johore Sultanate.

Bendahara in Pahang

Tun Abdul Majid, Raja Bendahara Pahang I (1777–1802)
Tun Muhammad,  Raja Bendahara Pahang II
Tun Koris, Bendahara Paduka Raja,  Raja Bendahara Pahang III (1803–1806)
Tun Ali, Bendahara Siwa Raja,  Raja Bendahara Pahang IV (1806–1847)
Tun Mutahir, Bendahara Seri Maharaja, Raja Bendahara Pahang V (1847–1863). He was the last reigning Raja Bendahara of Pahang. He was ousted by his brother Raja Rosmawe who was later proclaimed as Sultan of Pahang after the dismemberment of the Johore Empire.

Modern-day usage
In modern times of Malaysia, it is typical to render the position as prime minister. Though a bendahara's duties are similar to that of a prime minister's, the two terms are not interchangeable. One clear difference is the amount of power held by the two positions. In ancient times, the bendahara was typically the highest-ranking official after the sultan but the sultan retained ultimate authority. The sultan was not answerable to the bendahara, or to anyone else for that matter. The sultan was not just a constitutional monarchy like the Yang di-Pertuan Agong in contemporary Malaysia where the Prime Minister holds effective political power.

Current titles used:
Tengku Bendahara Selangor
Tengku Sharif Bendahara Perlis
Tengku Sri Bendahara Raja Terengganu
Tunku Bendahara Kedah
Tengku Bendahara Kelantan
Tengku Arif Bendahara Pahang
Tunku Aris Bendahara Johor
Raja Bendahara of Perak

In Brunei, the term of Bendahara is still used where it is known as "Pengiran Bendahara Seri Maharaja Permaisuara Brunei".

In Indonesia, a treasurer is commonly referred as Bendahara. In Malaysia the equivalent/similar term for the treasurer of a small organisation/club is "bendahari".

In the Philippines, the term Bendahara was recorded by Antonio Pigafetta during the Ferdinand Magellan expedition to refer to the Prime Minister of the Rajahnate of Cebu who was the brother of Rajah Humabon, king of that Polity.

See also
 Raja Bendahara
 Laksamana
 Penghulu Bendahari
 Shahbandar
 Temenggung

References

Bibliography
R.O. Windstedt, Bendaharas and Temenggungs, Journal of Malayan Branch of Royal Asiatic Society, Vol X part I, 1932
R.O. Windstedt, Early Rulers of Perak, Pahang and Acheh, Journal of Malayan Branch of Royal Asiatic Society, Vol X part I, 1932
R.O. Windstedt, A History of Johore, Journal of Malayan Branch of Royal Asiatic Society, Vol X part III, 1932
(Tun) Suzana (Tun) Othman, Institusi Bendahara; Permata Melayu yang hilang, 2002, 
(Tun) Suzana (Tun) Othman, Tun Seri Lanang: Sejarah dan Warisan Tokoh Melayu Tradisional, 2008, 
(Tun) Suzana (Tun) Othman, Perang bendahara Pahang, 1857-63: pensejarahan semula menelusi peranan British, 2007, 

Military history of Malaysia
Malay culture
Executive ministers
Heads of government